Paratelmatobius poecilogaster is a species of frog in the family Leptodactylidae. It is endemic to the Serra do Mar range, Brazil.
It is a terrestrial frog found near small temporary streams inside primary forest. The eggs are laid in small ponds at the edges of the temporary streams. Though the known populations are known from inside protected areas, it is likely to be threatened by habitat loss outside those areas.

References

poecilogaster
Endemic fauna of Brazil
Amphibians of Brazil
Amphibians described in 1990
Taxonomy articles created by Polbot